14 Herculis or 14 Her is the Flamsteed designation of a K-type main-sequence star approximately 58.5 light-years away in the constellation Hercules.  Because of its apparent magnitude, the star cannot be seen with the naked eye. As of 2006, it is thought that 14 Herculis has two extrasolar planets in orbit around the star.

Stellar components 
14 Herculis is an orange dwarf star of the spectral type K0V. It is thought that the star has 90 percent of the mass, 87 percent of the radius, and only 63 percent of the luminosity of the Sun.  The star appears to be 2.7 times as enriched with elements heavier than hydrogen (based on its abundance of iron), in comparison to the Sun. It may be the most metal rich star as at 2001.

Planetary system 
In 1998 a planet, 14 Herculis b was discovered orbiting 14 Herculis. The planet's eccentric orbital period is 4.8 years. In 2005, a possible second planet was proposed, designated 14 Herculis c. The parameters of this planet were very uncertain, but an initial analysis suggested that it was in the 4:1 resonance with the inner planet, with an orbital period of almost 19 years at an orbital distance of 6.9 AU. The existence of the planet 14 Herculis c was confirmed in 2021, together with a rough orbit determination. Another 2021 study found that the planetary orbits are not coplanar, which may indicate a strong planet-planet scattering event in the past. However, a 2022 study estimated inclinations consistent with aligned orbits.

See also 
 47 Ursae Majoris
 List of stars in Hercules
 Lists of exoplanets

References

External links 
 
 
 

Herculis, 014
Hercules (constellation)
145675
079248
0614
Durchmusterung objects
K-type main-sequence stars
Planetary systems with two confirmed planets